Sai Baba Mandir may refer to:
 any temple or mandir dedicated to either Sai Baba of Shirdi or Sathya Sai Baba
 Sai Shiva Balaji Mandir, Dharmapuri